Domingos Nascimento dos Santos Filho (born 12 December 1985), simply known as Domingos, is a Brazilian footballer who plays as a central defender.

Career 

Born in Muniz Ferreira, Bahia, he began his career in the youth side with Santos who was 2004 promoted to the Campeonato Brasileiro Série A team after 32 games and one game in his first season joined in winter 2005 to rival Grêmio on loan. On 15 September 2009 Santos Futebol Clube have loaned their central defender to second division club Portuguesa.

Honours
Santos
Brazilian League: 2004
São Paulo State League: 2006, 2007

Grêmio
Brazilian League (2nd division): 2005

References

External links
 
 
 
 Domingos at ZeroZero

1985 births
Living people
Brazilian footballers
Brazilian expatriate footballers
Expatriate footballers in Qatar
Campeonato Brasileiro Série A players
Campeonato Brasileiro Série B players
Campeonato Brasileiro Série D players
Santos FC players
Grêmio Foot-Ball Porto Alegrense players
Associação Portuguesa de Desportos players
Associação Desportiva São Caetano players
Guarani FC players
Al Kharaitiyat SC players
Esporte Clube Santo André players
Associação Atlética Aparecidense players
Association football defenders
Qatar Stars League players